Nomeidae, the driftfishes, are a family of percomorph fishes found in tropical and subtropical waters throughout the world.  The family includes about 16 species. The largest species, such as the Cape fathead, Cubiceps capensis, reach 1 m in length.

Several species are found in association with siphonophores (which are colonies of tiny individual animals that have specialised functions which resemble jellyfish) such as the Portuguese man o' war; the man-of-war fish, Nomeus gronovii, is known to eat its tentacles and gonads, as well as feeding on other jellyfishes. Other species of driftfishes are associated with the floating seaweed Sargassum. The Cape fathead feeds mainly on salps.  Some species of Cubiceps are occasionally caught on pelagic longlines set for swordfish.

Timeline of genera

References 

 

 
Taxa named by Albert Günther